The 2012 WSBL season was the 24th season of the Women's State Basketball League (SBL). The regular season began on Friday 16 March and ended on Saturday 28 July. The finals began on Friday 3 August and ended on Friday 31 August, when the South West Slammers defeated the Rockingham Flames in the WSBL Grand Final.

Regular season
The regular season began on Friday 16 March and ended on Saturday 28 July after 20 rounds of competition. An additional round was added in 2012 to lighten the travel load of regional teams.

Due to an ineligible player taking part in an SBL qualifying game, the South West Slammers were deemed to have forfeited a round sixteen victory against the Wanneroo Wolves after they suited up a development player but failed to lodge a contract, player registration and proof of citizenship which are all documents required by the league before a player can take the court.

Standings

Finals
The finals began on Friday 3 August and ended on Friday 31 August with the WSBL Grand Final.

Bracket

Awards

Statistics leaders

Regular season
 Most Valuable Player: Emma Cannon (Rockingham Flames)
 Coach of the Year: Ryan Petrik (Rockingham Flames)
 Most Improved Player: Adrienne Jones (Kalamunda Eastern Suns)
 All-Star Five:
 PG: Adrienne Jones (Kalamunda Eastern Suns)
 SG: Kim Sitzmann (South West Slammers)
 SF: Jasmine Hooper (Willetton Tigers)
 PF: Stephanie Jones (Cockburn Cougars)
 C: Emma Cannon (Rockingham Flames)

Finals
 Grand Final MVP: Kim Sitzmann (South West Slammers)

References

External links
 2012 fixtures
 Week Four Player of the Week

2012
2011–12 in Australian basketball
2012–13 in Australian basketball